The Women's singles competition began on 8 October 2010. There were a total of XX competitors.

Preliminaries

Group 1

8 October

9 October

Group 2

8 October

9 October

Group 3

8 October

9 October

Group 4

8 October

Group 5

8 October

9 October

Group 6

Group 7

Group 8

Group 9

Group 10

Group 11

Group 12

Group 13

Group 14

Group 15

Group 16

Group 17

Group 18

Group 19

Group 20

Elimination rounds

First quarter

Second quarter

Third quarter

Fourth quarter

Semifinals

See also
2010 Commonwealth Games
Table tennis at the 2010 Commonwealth Games

References

Table tennis at the 2010 Commonwealth Games
Common